Marcel Louis Michel Antoine Bich, baron Bich (29 July 1914 – 30 May 1994) was an Italian-born French manufacturer and co-founder of Bic, the world's leading producer of ballpoint pens, lighters, and razors.

Early years
Bich was born in Turin, Italy on 29 July 1914 to Aimé-Mario Bich (1882–1955) and Marie Muffat de Saint-Amour de Chanaz (1886–1967). His family moved to Spain and then to France where Bich was naturalised as a French citizen in 1932 and later studied law at the University of Paris. He served in the French Air Force at the outset of World War II.

The Bich family originated at Châtillon, and earlier in the Valtournenche valley, in the Aosta Valley. King Charles Albert of Sardinia granted Emmanuel Bich, mayor of Aosta, the title of baron in 1841. Emmanuel's grandson Aimé-Mario Bich, the father of Marcel Bich, was an engineer who moved to France after failing to gain commercial success in Italy.

Business success
In 1944, Marcel Bich and his partner, Édouard Buffard, bought an empty factory in the Paris suburb of Clichy, where they began the production of inexpensive pen holders and pencil cases.

Bich was originally a skeptic of ballpoint pens, which at the time were unreliable and leaked. In 1946, however, by observing the channel made by the wheel of his wheelbarrow in the ground, he understood the USP of the ballpoint pen. Just as the wheel made transporting items easier, the ball could allow the hand to be free from the constraints of the pen nib and make writing more fluid.

Marcel Bich bought the patent for the ballpoint pen for US$2 million from Hungarian László Bíró who had been producing such pens since 1943 in Argentina. Using Swiss watchmaking tools, he devised a manufacturing process that produced stainless-steel balls for the tip of the pen, and the Bic Cristal ballpoint pen became his first product in 1950. The Bic Cristal ballpoint pen went on to become a worldwide best-seller, and the design remains mostly unchanged today. Bich formed Société Bic in 1953.

Bich partnered with poster designer Raymond Savignac to create the company's advertisements, who created the Bic Boy that later became part of the company's official logo. Bic won the first French Oscar for advertising, sponsored the Tour de France, and became an essential item and a household name.

Between 1950 and the 1970s, Bic expanded globally, into Italy, the Netherlands, Austria, Switzerland and Spain, followed by South America and North America.

In 1973, Bic introduced a disposable pocket lighter that could provide 3,000 lights before wearing out. In 1975, the brand released the one-piece polystyrene razor, the first single-piece disposable razor with an integrated blade and a lightweight plastic handle.

The company formed by Bich still exists as the Société Bic Group and is listed on the Paris Stock Exchange and majority-owned by his family.

Bich stepped down as Chairman of Societe Bic in 1993. He was succeeded by his son, Bruno, who served as chairman for 25 years, 15 of which also as CEO. Marcel's grandson Gonzalve Bich has been CEO since 2018.

Yacht racing and sailing
Bich was a keen sailor. He funded four campaigns to compete in the trials to select a challenger for the America's Cup in 1970, 1974, 1977 and 1980, and was inducted, posthumously, into the America's Cup Hall of Fame in 1998.

Personal

Bich was one of three children, he had a sister Marie Thérèse Louise Antoinette Léandra Bich (1913–1970) and brother Albert Bich (1916–1989).

He was married to Louise Chamussy in 1937. After her death in 1950 he went on to marry Jacqueline de Dufourq (1911–2007, divorced) and, in 1956, Laurence Courier de Mère (1932–). He had 11 children.

Death 
He died on 30 May 1994 in Paris, aged 79. His first wife, Louise Chamussy, died in 1950. He was survived by his wife, Laurence Courier de Mere, 11 children and several grandchildren and great-grandchildren.

References

External links
BIC Corporate History
Obituary, The Independent

1914 births
1994 deaths
20th-century French businesspeople
1970 America's Cup sailors
French male sailors (sport)
Italian emigrants to France
University of Paris alumni
1974 America's Cup sailors
1977 America's Cup sailors
1980 America's Cup sailors
French Air Force personnel of World War II